Mount Stanford, at an elevation of , is on the Kings-Kern Divide in Kings Canyon National Park. It is named for Stanford University.

History 
On August 1, 1896 Professor Bolton Coit Brown of Stanford made the first recorded ascent and requested that it be named Mount Stanford. Since there was another peak with the same name in Placer County, he suggested the peak he climbed be named Stanford University peak if his first choice was rejected. The decision was made to give the name Castle Peak to the summit in Placer County and Brown's first choice was accepted. Three years later, on August 16, 1899, Stanford University's President, David Starr Jordan, also make the ascent with his wife and a party from Stanford. He had previously climbed in the Alps.
In 1911, the U. S. Geological Survey (USGS) named a peak in honor of Leland Stanford, an American tycoon, politician and founder of Stanford University. The name originally given this summit was Stanford Peak but in 1982 the USGS changed its name to Mount Stanford.

Getting There 
Mount Stanford is described as an exposed scramble. It can be ascended by experienced mountaineers without ropes or special equipment during the late summer months. It can be most easily be reached from the Onion Valley trailhead, west of Independence and off U. S. Route 395.

References 

Mountains of Kings Canyon National Park
Mountains of Tulare County, California
Mountains of Northern California